The 2021 LEC season was the third year of the League of Legends European Championship (LEC), a professional esports league for the MOBA PC game League of Legends, following its rebranding in late 2018. The spring regular season began on 22 January, and concluded on 14 March, while the playoffs started on 26 March and concluded on 11 April. The summer split began on 22 June, and playoffs concluded on 1 August. The three teams that qualified for the 2021 World Championship were MAD Lions, Fnatic, and Rogue, respectively.

Teams 
The Astralis Group merged its LEC team Origen into the Astralis brand prior to the 2021 season.

Spring

Regular season

Individual awards

Summer

Regular season

Championship Points for playoffs seeding

Playoffs

Individual awards

References 

League of Legends
League of Legends European Championship seasons
2021 multiplayer online battle arena tournaments
League of Legends European Championship season, 2021